Carlos Alberto Poblete Jofré is a former Chilean football player. Also, former head coach of Puebla F.C. in the Liga MX.

Club career
He began his career with the Chilean club Universidad de Chile in 1980, where he played until 1986 when he transferred to the Mexican club Puebla FC. During his first year he scored eight goals in 35 games, which did not convince the coach or the owners, so he was sent out on loan to crosstown rival Ángeles de Puebla. While playing there he scored 20 goals, which got the attention of Puebla FC's coach, so he was transferred back. In the 1988–89 tournament he scored 23 goals. In 1989–90 he increased his goal scoring further, scoring 22, including two in the 1989 final against Leones Negros.

After the 1992 tournament, with the club in hiatus after losing the 1992 final, he was transferred to Cruz Azul where he managed to score 14 goals. In the 1993 tournament he was sent to Veracruz, where he spent two years scoring 15 goals in 64 games. In 1995, he returned to Puebla FC where he scored his last seven with the club. He finished with 83, placing himself third all time in the club's records. At the end of the tournament he left for his native Chile where he played with Club Deportivo O'Higgins for the 1996 tournament. In 1997, he again returned to Mexico to play with Unión de Curtidores where he retired.

International career
He represented Chile at the 1983 Pan American Games in Caracas, Venezuela, making an appearance versus Cuba U23. In addition, he made appearances for the Chile B-team in the friendly tournament 1985 Indonesian Independence Cup, where Chile became champion.

Personal life
He was nicknamed Búfalo (Buffalo) due to his corpulence.

After his retirement, he has performed as a football commentator.

His son of the same name, Carlos Poblete Aguerrebere, is a Mexican former footballer who played for clubs suchs as Lobos BUAP, Puebla, among others.

Honours
Puebla
 Primera División de México: 1989–90
 Copa México: 1989–90
 Campeón de Campeones: 
 Copa de Campeones de la Concacaf: 1991

Chile B
 Indonesian Independence Cup (1):

References

External links
Carlos Poblete at PlaymakerStats
Medio Tiempo stats

1963 births
Living people
Footballers from Santiago
Chilean footballers
Chilean expatriate footballers
Chile youth international footballers
Chile international footballers
Universidad de Chile footballers
Club Puebla players
Cruz Azul footballers
C.D. Veracruz footballers
O'Higgins F.C. footballers
Unión de Curtidores footballers
Chilean Primera División players
Liga MX players
Ascenso MX players
Chilean expatriate sportspeople in Mexico
Expatriate footballers in Mexico
Association football forwards
Chilean football managers
Chilean expatriate football managers
Lobos BUAP managers
Club Puebla managers
Liga MX managers
Expatriate football managers in Mexico
Chilean association football commentators